SRIM may refer to:

Stopping and Range of Ions in Matter
Structural reaction injection molding, a specialized type of injection molding for reinforced thermosets